The Reserve Infantry Division of Hunan() is a reserve infantry formation of the People's Liberation Army.

The Reserve Division of Zhuzhou was formally activated in 1984 in Zhuzhou, Guizhou. The division was then composed of:
1st Regiment
2nd Regiment
3rd Regiment
Artillery Regiment

In 1985 the division was redesignated as the Reserve Infantry Division of Zhuzhou().

In 1999 the division was then redesignated as the Reserve Infantry Division of Hunan. 

From 2017 the division was composed of:
1st Regiment - Xiangtan, Hunan
2nd Regiment - Changde, Hunan
3rd Regiment - Yueyang, Hunan
Artillery Regiment - Zhuzhou, Hunan
Anti-Aircraft Artillery Regiment - Changsha, Hunan

References

Reserve divisions of the People's Liberation Army
Military units and formations established in 1984